The Coalition of Activist Lesbians Australia (COAL) was formed in Australia in 1994 to work towards the end of discrimination against lesbians.  COAL lobbies the Australian Commonwealth and other state and territory Governments to remove discrimination against lesbians. COAL lobbied at the UN 4th World Conference on Women, Beijing, 1995, and co-hosted the first international lesbian-space tent at the 1995 NGO Forum. Among a number of other organisations, COAL successfully lobbied for the Australian Government to sign the Optional Protocol to the Convention for the Elimination of All Forms of Discrimination Against Women (CEDAW).  They are Australia's national lesbian advocacy organisation and the only United Nations accredited lesbian non-government organisation.

See also

LGBT rights in Australia
List of LGBT rights organizations
National Center for Lesbian Rights - national lesbian rights organization in the United States

References

External links
 Coalition of Activist Lesbians-Australia— official website

LGBT political advocacy groups in Australia
Lesbian organisations based in Australia
1994 establishments in Australia